Gajwel, officially Gajwel–Pragnapur, is a town and a municipality in Siddipet district of the Indian state of Telangana. Gajwel–Pragnapur Nagar Panchayat was constituted in 2012. Gajwel is about 53 km from Hyderabad on the Rajiv highway. It is one of the fastest-developing town in Telangana.

Awards 
Gajwel has been awarded for the "Best Clean City Award" in a municipality category of 20 to 50 population category.

Geography 
Gajwel is located at 17.8517°N 78.6828°E. It has an average elevation of 568 meters (1866 ft) above sea level. Gajwel is about 53km from Secundrerabad on the Rajiv highway. The nearest airport is Rajiv Gandhi International Airport in the Telangana capital city, Hyderabad.

Administration

Till 2012 Gajwel was a Panchayat and in the year 2012 it was upgraded as Nagara Panchayat vide G.O. No.34, dated: 251-01-2012, duly merging surrounding three (3) Gram panchayats i.e., 1. Pragnapur, 2. Mutrajapally and 3. Kyasaram Gram Panchayats and 5 numbers of hamlets namely Rajireddy Pally, Sangupally, Sangapur, Lingarajpet and Gundannapally in Medak District.
Gajwel-Pragnapur Nagara Panchayath is spread over an area of 49.26sq. km. out of which about 6.3Sq km is habituated area and remaining area is vacant land . town is divided into 20 wards and elected body is in place to govern ULB.

Politics 
Gajwel Assembly constituency is a constituency of Telangana Legislative Assembly, India.It is one of 10 constituencies in Siddipet district. It consists of 6 mandals: Toopran, Kondapak, Gajwel, Jagadevpur, wargal, Markook and Mulug. Pendam Vasudev was the first MLA and J. B. Muthyal Rao was the second MLA of Gajwel. Gajwel Saidaiah, Allam Sailu, Sanjeeva Rao, Geetha Reddy, Vijaya Rama Rao, Sanjeeva Rao, Narsa Reddy, K.Chandrashekar Rao then followed. Gajwel Saidaiah won 4 times from 1962-1978.  Telangana first Chief Minister Kalvakuntla Chandrashekar Rao is current MLA from Gajwel seat.

Transport

Airway
The nearest Airport is Rajiv Gandhi International Airport at Shamshabad

Warangal Airport at Mamnoor along with Ramagundam Airport are the other two airports in the vicinity, however they are closed pending revivial plans via UDAN scheme

Road
National Highway 161AA passes through Gajwel

Rail
Gajwel has a railway station and is a part of the Kothapalli-Manoharabad in construction railway line. As of January 2023, the construction is complete up until Kodakondla, with the remaining work to Kothapalli to be completed by 2025. Once complete, Gajwel will be connected with Karimnagar, Sircilla, Siddipet, Manoharabad, Secundarabad etc.

References 

Mandal headquarters in Siddipet district
Villages in Siddipet district